The Old Stone Arch Bridge is a single-span stone arch bridge which crosses Jack's Creek in Derry Township, Mifflin County, Pennsylvania. Philip Diehl built the bridge in 1813 as part of the Harrisburg to Pittsburgh Turnpike; it is the oldest bridge of its type in central Pennsylvania. The turnpike had been authorized in 1807, and the section from Harrisburg to Lewistown, on which the bridge lies, was completed in 1818. Lithographers Currier and Ives made prints of the bridge in 1850.

The bridge was added to the National Register of Historic Places on April 18, 1979.

References

Road bridges on the National Register of Historic Places in Pennsylvania
Bridges completed in 1813
Transportation buildings and structures in Mifflin County, Pennsylvania
National Register of Historic Places in Mifflin County, Pennsylvania
Stone arch bridges in the United States